is a Japanese manga artist, known for their work Jujutsu Kaisen. Gege Akutami is a pen name and the author's real name and gender are unknown.

Biography 
Gege Akutami was born in Iwate Prefecture on February 26, 1992. Akutami moved to Sendai in Miyagi Prefecture in the fifth grade. Akutami began drawing manga by mimicking a friend, which inspired them to become a professional manga artist. Akutami has named Tite Kubo as an influence in their work after reading Bleach in the fourth grade, in addition to Hunter × Hunter and Neon Genesis Evangelion among other works. In 2014, Gege Akutami started working as assistant to Yasuhiro Kanō in Kiss x Death.

They published their first work the same year, titled , a one-shot chapter published in Shueisha's Jump NEXT! vol. 2 on May 7, 2014. Their next work was No.9, with a one-shot chapter published in Jump NEXT! vol. 2 on May 1, 2015, and another one-shot in the 46th issue of Weekly Shōnen Jump on October 10, 2015. Akutami would publish the one-shot  in the 2016 44th issue of Weekly Shōnen Jump, released on October 3, 2016. This one-shot was nominated for the 11th "Gold Future Cup" contest of the magazine. In 2017, Akutami published , a 4-chapter series that ran in Jump GIGA from April 28 to July 28, 2017. This series would serve later as a prequel to their next work, Jujutsu Kaisen, being retroactively titled as Jujutsu Kaisen 0. Akutami began the publication of Jujutsu Kaisen in the 2018 14th issue of Weekly Shōnen Jump, released on March 5, 2018.

Works 
  (2014) — One-shot published in Shueisha's Shōnen Jump Next!.
 No.9 (2015) — One-shot published in Shueisha's Shōnen Jump Next!.
 No.9 (2015) — One-shot published in Shueisha's Weekly Shōnen Jump.
  (2016) — One-shot published in Shueisha's Weekly Shōnen Jump.
  (2017) — Serialized in Shueisha's Jump GIGA.
  (2018–present) — Serialized in Shueisha's Weekly Shōnen Jump.

Awards 
In 2016, Akutami's one-shot Nikai Bongai Barabarujura was nominated for Weekly Shōnen Jumps 11th Gold Future Cup contest. In 2019, their manga Jujutsu Kaisen was nominated for the 65th Shogakukan Manga Award in the shōnen category. Akutami is the 2020 grand prize winner for Jujutsu Kaisen on Mando Kobayashi, Kendo Kobayashi's monthly manga variety show where winners are selected on their personal taste. In 2021, Akutami's Jujutsu Kaisen was listed as a nominee for the 25th Annual Tezuka Osamu Cultural Prize.

References

External links 
 

Manga artists from Iwate Prefecture
Living people
1992 births
Pseudonymous writers